The Qikiqtaaluk Region, Qikiqtani Region (Inuktitut syllabics: ᕿᑭᖅᑖᓗᒃ ) or Baffin Region is the easternmost, northernmost, and southernmost administrative region of Nunavut, Canada. Qikiqtaaluk is the traditional Inuktitut name for Baffin Island. Although the Qikiqtaaluk Region is the most commonly used name in official contexts, several notable public organizations, including Statistics Canada prefer the older term Baffin Region.

The region consists of Baffin Island, the Belcher Islands, Akimiski Island, Mansel Island, Prince Charles Island, Bylot Island, Devon Island, Baillie-Hamilton Island, Cornwallis Island, Bathurst Island, Amund Ringnes Island, Ellef Ringnes Island, Axel Heiberg Island, Ellesmere Island, the Melville Peninsula, the eastern part of Melville Island, and the northern parts of both Prince of Wales Island and Somerset Island, plus smaller islands in between. The regional centre, and territorial capital, is Iqaluit (population 7,740). The Qikiqtaaluk Region spans the northernmost, easternmost, and southernmost areas of Nunavut.

Before 1999, the Qikiqtaaluk Region existed under slightly different boundaries in the Northwest Territories as the Baffin Region, in the northern part of the District of Keewatin.

The western half of the nearby Hans Island is part of the Qikiqtaaluk, while the eastern half is part of Greenland and is in the municipality of Avannaata.

Communities

All of Qikiqtaaluk's thirteen communities are located on tidal water and just under half of its residents live in Nunavut's capital and only city, Iqaluit (7,740.). The majority of the rest live in twelve hamlets—Arctic Bay (868), Kinngait (1,441), Clyde River (1,053), Grise Fiord (129), Sanirajak (848), Igloolik (1,682), Kimmirut (389), Pangnirtung (1,481), Pond Inlet (1,617), Qikiqtarjuaq (598), Resolute (198) and Sanikiluaq (882). Alert (CFS Alert) and Eureka are part of the Baffin, Unorganized (62) areas in the Qikiqtaaluk.

Formerly there was a mining town at Nanisivik. However, it and the Nanisivik Mine closed in 2002, with Nanisivik Airport closing in 2010 and all flights transferred to Arctic Bay Airport.
 
Like the majority of Canada's Inuit communities, the region's traditional foods include seal, Arctic char, walrus, polar bear, and caribou.

Inhabitants of the Qikiqtaaluk Region are called Qikiqtaalungmiut.

Iqaluit

Iqaluit has the Astro Hill Complex, the Nunatta Sunakkutaangit Museum and the Legislative Building of Nunavut and the Unikkaarvik Visitors Centre.

Pre-contact
According to anthropologists and historians, the Inuit are the descendants of the Thule people who displaced the Dorset culture (in Inuktitut, the Tuniit). By 1300 the Inuit had trade routes with more southern cultures.

History

About 1910, Europeans markets increased their interest in white fox pelts. The distribution and mobility of Inuit changed as the expanded their traditional hunting and fishing routes to participate in the white fox fur trade. Traditional food staples—such as seal and caribou—were not always found in the same regions as white fox. The Hudson's Bay Company—which was chartered in 1670—had been opening fur trading posts throughout Inuit and First Nations territory. By 1910, the HBC was restructured into a lands sales department, retail and fur trade. The HBC dominated the fur trade under minimal supervision from the Canadian government, and some Anglican and Catholic missionaries who lived near remote northern hamlets. By 1922 most of imported goods acquired by Inuit were from the HBC.

Relocation

Between 1950 and 1975 thirteen northern communities were relocated.

Killing of the sled dogs

In the 1950s and 1960s the Royal Canadian Mounted Police (RCMP) and others in authority undertook "the widespread killing of sled dogs".

Reconciliation and truth commissions
The Qikigtani Truth Commission—which was commissioned, conducted, and paid for by an Aboriginal organization, the Qikiqtani Inuit Association and took place from 2007 to 2010—brought together historians and Inuit to revisit the history of the Qikigtaaluk Region.

Protected areas

Auyuittuq National Park
Bowman Bay Wildlife Sanctuary
Katannilik Territorial Park Reserve
Kekerten Territorial Park
Mallikjuak Territorial Park
Pisuktinu-Tunngavik Territorial Park
Polar Bear Pass National Wildlife Area
Quammaarviit Territorial Park
Quttinirpaaq National Park
Sirmilik National Park
Sylvia Grinnell Territorial Park

Demographics

Surrounding census divisions

Division No. 11, Newfoundland and Labrador (Nunatsiavut)
Division No. 23, Manitoba
Inuvik Region
Kivalliq Region
Kitikmeot Region

See also

Akudnirmiut Inuit
Netsilik Inuit
Ellesmere Island Volcanics
Strathcona Fiord

References

Further reading

 Kavik, Lisi, and Miriam Fleming. Qikiqtamiut Cookbook. [Sanikiluaq, Nunavut]: Municipality of Sanikiluaq, 2002.

External links 

 Qikiqtaaluk Region information at Explore Nunavut

 
Census divisions of Nunavut